Rudi Supek (Zagreb, 8 April 1913 – Zagreb, 2 January 1993) was a Croatian sociologist, philosopher  and a member of the Praxis School of Marxism.

Supek studied philosophy in Zagreb and graduated in 1937. He went to study clinical psychology in Paris, where he was when World War II erupted. He joined the resistance movement, but soon was captured and deported to the Buchenwald concentration camp, where he took part in the Buchenwald Resistance. After the liberation, Supek went back to Paris to continue living and studying there. In 1948, after the Informbiro Resolution against Josip Broz Tito's Yugoslavia, the leader of the French Communists Maurice Thorez asked Supek, who was a member of the French Communist Party, to attack Titoism. Supek refused to comply and returned to Yugoslavia. However, he did not become a member of the Communist Party of Yugoslavia.

Supek earned his PhD from the Sorbonne in 1952 and started to work as a professor at the Department of Psychology of the Faculty of Humanities and Social Sciences, University of Zagreb, and at the Institute for Social Research in Zagreb. He founded the Department of Sociology at the Faculty of Humanities and Social Sciences in 1963. Supek became the first president of the Yugoslav Society of Psychologists, and for a period he was the president of the Yugoslav Society of Sociologists.

Supek was chief editor of the journal Pogledi (Viewpoints) which was published from 1952 to 1954. In 1964 Supek and several colleagues from the Zagreb Faculty of Humanities and Social Sciences founded the Praxis journal. Supek was co-editor of the journal from 1967 to 1973. He initiated and became president of the Management Board of the Korčula Summer School.

In 2004, the Croatian Sociological Association established the annual Rudi Supek Award for achievements in sociology in his honour.

Major works

Supek wrote many books and articles ranging from sociology to psychopathology, anthropology, and philosophy. His major works are:

Existentialism and Decadence (1950)
Sociology and Socialism (1962)
Herbert Spencer and the Biologism in Sociology (1965)
Humanist Intelligentsia and Politics (1969)
Social Prejudices (1973)
Participation, Workers’ Control and Self-management (1974)
Living after History (1986)

External links
 Rudi Supek Archive at marxists.org
 "Marx and Revolution" (in Croatian)
Ratko R. Božović "In memoriam" (in Serbian)

1913 births
1993 deaths
Scientists from Zagreb
University of Paris alumni
Marxist theorists
Croatian sociologists
20th-century Croatian philosophers
French communists
French sociologists
Croatian communists
Croatian scientists
Croatian atheists
Existentialists
Burials at Mirogoj Cemetery
French male writers
Yugoslav philosophers
Croatian Marxists